The Cheese Store of Beverly Hills is a gourmet foods store in Beverly Hills, California, known for its selection of 500-600 cheeses. It also stocks wines and other delicacies, including the rarest of all caviars, Golden Imperial Osetra, and is often featured in publications such as Bon Appétit and Entrepreneur magazine, as a notable epicurean source. The store claims to carry “the largest assortment of goat’s and sheep’s milk cheeses found anywhere”.  The store's owner, Norbert Wabnig, has become a noted Los Angeles personality.

The store, housed in a refurbished 1920s brick building, has supplied many of Los Angeles' high-end restaurants past and present, including Wolfgang Puck’s Spago, Valentino’s, Patina, and Bar Marmont, as well as Las Vegas’ Bellagio hotel.

History
The Beverly Hills branch of Cheese Shop International, an East Coast-based franchise, was founded in 1967 by Colonel Sigmund Roth. In 1978, after a few years of the colonel's declining health, Norbert Wabnig, who had worked at the store by day while pursuing his music career at night, purchased the business and changed its name to The Cheese Store of Beverly Hills. He transformed the store's feel from one of an upscale chain store to the more European style that it retains today.  Wabnig has often stated that he likes the community aspect of the store, which often hosts wine tastings.

As a way of recognizing the producers of handmade specialty foods from whom he sources his products, in 2004 Wabnig founded the American Artisanal Treasure Awards. Awards are presented for Best Cheese, Best Olive Oil, and Best Condiment.

In 2005, the store introduced its house wine, Scoundrel, a cabernet bottled by Sylvester Vineyards in Paso Robles, California. Wabnig's daughter, Talia, designed the label.

Products
Because of its epicurean nature, The Cheese Store of Beverly Hills has been known to carry hard-to-find and high-end ingredients, which over the years have included Austrian pumpkin seed oil, fresh truffles (in season), varieties of French butter, various kinds of Russian caviar (Golden Imperial Osetra and Sevruga), French and Spanish hams, Italian prosciutto, and 25 varieties of extra virgin olive oil. As part of the store's environmental ethos customers are encouraged to bring their own bottles, which are then filled with olive oil.

Owner
Born in Vienna, Austria, on August 11, 1948, Norbert Wabnig and his family moved to New Orleans in 1955, but returned during summers to Vienna, where he apprenticed in the kitchen of his uncle Franz Blauensteiner's restaurant, Gausthaus au Stadt Paris, a popular spot for celebrities such as Oskar Werner and Klaus Maria Brandauer. After graduating from the University of New Orleans, Wabnig moved to Los Angeles to pursue a music career with his band Wendell Nightfall Troupe. To support himself, Wabnig took a job at what is now The Cheese Store of Beverly Hills, which he later bought in 1978.

Wabnig travels the world in search of cheeses for the store.  He is a member of the American Cheese Society and often assists top culinary schools – including The Cordon Bleu Program at the California School of Culinary Arts, and The New School of Cooking – with cheese courses.

Wabnig and Ruthie Grahm composed the theme song for the Los Angeles chapter of Meals on Wheels.

In popular culture
Eat, Drink or Die. Wabnig hosted a Cheese of the Day video series for the popular epicurean website.

In 2007, Wabnig appeared on the History (formerly, The History Channel) series Modern Marvels, as a cheese expert.

Awards
Received 2-Leaf ranking from Greenopia Los Angeles as a Distinguished Business for 2008–2009.
Voted Best Cheese Shop in Los Angeles in 2007 and 2008 and 2009 by MyFoxLA.
Awarded the “Best Gourmet Food Store” by editors and readers for Los Angeles’ edition of the Best of Citysearch website poll in 2006 and 2007.
Rated #1 Overall, #1 for Cheese, and #1 for Beverly Hills by Zagat every year from 1997 to 2001. In Zagat’s 1999/2000 Survey, it was one of only two food sources to receive a score of 29 points.
Los Angeles Magazine listed the store in its "Best of LA 1996."

References

External links
 

Landmarks in Los Angeles
Companies based in Beverly Hills, California
Retail companies established in 1967
Cheese retailers
1967 establishments in California
Buildings and structures in Beverly Hills, California
Food retailers of the United States
Dairy products companies in California
American companies established in 1967